Allium is a genus with 600-920 species, making it one of the largest plant genera in the world.

, the World Checklist of Selected Plant Families accepts 920 species:

A

B

C

D

E

F

G

H

I

J

K

L

M

N

O

P

Q
Allium qasyunense Mouterde

R

S

T

U

V

W

X

Y

Z

References

Allium
Allium, Species